Askeland is a village in Alver municipality in Vestland county, Norway. It sits on a small peninsula along the Hindnesfjorden, a branch off the main Austfjorden. It used to be in the Lindås municipality before it merged into the new Alver municipality in 2020.

References

Villages in Vestland
Alver (municipality)